Trifurcula sinica is a moth of the family Nepticulidae. It was described by Yang in 1989. It is known from the Shaanxi in China.

Adults have been recorded in April.

The larvae make galls in young branches of Prunus cerasifera, Prunus dulcis and Prunus persica.

References

Nepticulidae
Moths of Asia
Moths described in 1989